Françoise Bertin (23 September 1925 – 26 October 2014) was a French actress.

She appeared in over 125 films since 1961. Among these were five films directed by Alain Resnais: Last Year at Marienbad, Muriel, The War Is Over, I Want to Go Home, and Same Old Song.

Born in Paris on 23 September 1925, she died in Galan, Hautes-Pyrénées, on 26 October 2014.

Theater

Filmography

References

External links

1925 births
2014 deaths
Actresses from Paris
French film actresses